Ardozyga diplonesa is a species of moth in the family Gelechiidae. It was described by Edward Meyrick in 1904. It is found in Australia, where it has been recorded from Western Australia.

The forewings are grey densely mixed with white, the costa broadly suffused with white from near the base to near the apex. The discal stigmata are large, roundish, dark fuscous, the plical little marked or obsolete, somewhat obliquely beyond the first discal. The hindwings are pale grey, becoming darker posteriorly.

References

Ardozyga
Moths described in 1904
Taxa named by Edward Meyrick
Moths of Australia